Ruck may refer to:

 Ruck (rugby union), a contesting for the ball in Rugby Union from a grounded player
 Ruck (Australian rules football), an  aerial contest in Australian rules football between rival ruckmen
 Ruck (rugby league), the area surrounding a tackled player in rugby league football

People
 Sean Price, American rapper who went by the name Ruck as a member of Heltah Skeltah
 Alan Ruck (born 1956), American actor
 Berta Ruck (1878–1978), British writer of short stories and romance novels 
 Calvin Ruck (1925–2004), Canadian Senator and author
 Carl A. P. Ruck (born 1935), American professor of Classical Studies
 Carl Ruck (field hockey) (1912–1980), German field hockey player
 Caroline Rück, Swiss curler
 Monique Ruck-Petit (born 1942), Swiss and French chess master
 Richard Ruck (1851–1935), Welsh footballer and Royal Engineers soldier
 Róbert Ruck (born 1977), Hungarian chess grandmaster
 Sian Ruck (born 1953), New Zealand international cricketer
 Ulrich Rück (1882–1962), German collector of musical instruments and dealer in pianofortes
 Wolfgang Ruck (born 1946), Canadian sprint canoeist

See also
 Ruck family tree: showing the relationships between some of the above
 Rucker (disambiguation)